This is a list of railway stations in Cardiff, the capital of Wales. It only includes passenger heavy rail stations with timetabled services.

Rail operators
All 20 stations in Cardiff are owned by Network Rail and managed by Transport for Wales which also operates all train services at these stations, with the exception of Cardiff Central which is also served by CrossCountry and Great Western Railway.

Stations
The stations form part of Cardiff's commuter rail network, colloquially known as Valley Lines, with Cardiff Queen Street and Cardiff Central being the main hubs of the city. Cardiff Central is also one of the United Kingdom's major railway stations, providing connections to Newport, Bristol, Bath, London, Southampton, Portsmouth, Gloucester, Cheltenham, Birmingham and Nottingham. Cardiff Central continues to serve as major interchange on the British rail network, with 1,042,297 changes at the station in 08/09. Its passenger usage also increased by around 1.5 million to 11.3 million.

See also
Commuter rail in the United Kingdom
List of proposed railway stations in Wales - Cardiff area
List of railway stations in Wales
Transport in Cardiff
Transport in Wales

References 

Cardiff
 List of railway stations
Railway stations
Railway stations, Cardiff